John Gorman may refer to:

John Gorman (director) (1884–1936), American movie director
John Gorman (entertainer) (born 1936), English vocalist and musician
John Gorman (politician) (1923–2014), Northern Ireland politician
John Gorman (footballer) (born 1949), former football player and coach
John J. Gorman (1883–1949), U.S. Representative from Illinois
John R. Gorman (born 1925), auxiliary bishop of Chicago
John Gorman (radio executive) (born 1950), WMMS radio personality
Johnny Gorman (born 1992), Northern Ireland international football player
John Gorman (physician), Australian medical researcher
John P. Gorman (1897–1983), college football player and coach at Princeton University
John Patrick Gorman (1876–1963), Canadian politician in the Nova Scotia House of Assembly
John T. Gorman (1856–1926), American businessman and politician from New York